Glenn Brevik Andersen (born 5 April 1980) is a retired Norwegian footballer. He has previously played for Ørn-Horten, Strømsgodset and Start.

Retirement
Andersen retired after the 2018 season.

Career statistics

References

External links
Guardian's Stats Centre

1980 births
Living people
Norwegian footballers
FK Ørn-Horten players
IK Start players
Strømsgodset Toppfotball players
FK Jerv players
Norwegian First Division players
Eliteserien players
Association football defenders
People from Arendal
Sportspeople from Agder